Jeremy Butler (born April 22, 1991) is a former American football wide receiver. He was signed by the Baltimore Ravens as an undrafted free agent in 2014 and played for them in 2015 and 2016. He played college football at the University of Tennessee Martin.

College career
Butler played for the  University of Tennessee Martin as a wide receiver and earned third-team All-American honors after his improved senior year.

Professional career

Baltimore Ravens
After going undrafted in the 2014 NFL Draft Butler was signed as a free agent to the Baltimore Ravens on May 12, 2014. Butler was placed on the injured reserve list after suffering a shoulder sprain for his rookie season on September 1, 2014.

After returning from injury in his second year, he was expected to compete for a roster spot on the team, however he was released on September 5, 2015 as part of the final roster cuts. He was later re-signed to the practice squad. The Ravens activated Butler from the practice squad on October 26, 2015 as a result of many injuries and he became a frequent contributor to the offense.

On September 3, 2016, Butler was released by the Ravens.

Tampa Bay Buccaneers
On September 4, 2016, Butler was signed to the Buccaneers practice squad. He was promoted to the active roster on October 4, 2016. He was released on October 9, 2016.

New York Jets
On October 11, 2016, Butler signed with the New York Jets. He was released on October 29, 2016.

San Diego Chargers
Butler was claimed off waivers by the Chargers on October 31, 2016.

Buffalo Bills
On March 13, 2017, Butler signed a one-year contract with the Buffalo Bills. He was waived/injured on September 2, 2017 and placed on injured reserve.

References

External links
Profile at baltimoreravens.com

1991 births
Living people
African-American players of American football
American football wide receivers
UT Martin Skyhawks football players
Baltimore Ravens players
Tampa Bay Buccaneers players
New York Jets players
San Diego Chargers players
Buffalo Bills players
21st-century African-American sportspeople